Deivamagal ( God's daughter) is an Indian Tamil-language soap opera starring Vani Bhojan and Krishna. It was broadcast on Sun TV initially from Monday to Friday and later extended to Saturday at 8 PM from 25 March 2013 to 17 February 2018 for 1,466 episodes. The show replaced S. Kumaran's successful soap, Thirumathi Selvam and replaced by Nayagi. Deivamagal is currently retelecasting in Kalaignar TV from 1 March 2021 and later extended to Saturday at 07:00PM. 

The show is produced by Vikatan Televistas Pvt Ltd and director by S. Kumaran. This serial was shot in Pollachi, Chennai, Chengalpet, Hyderabad, Kerala, Puducherry, Cuddalore and Climax scene shot in One Island. This is the first TV serial shot in the Bay of Bengal.

Plot
The story mainly revolves around Prakash (Krishna), his wife Sathyapriya (Vani Bhojan) and his eldest sister-in-law Gayathri's conspiracies against their families to acquire Prakash's ancestral property Jai Hind Vilas.

Sathyapriya grows up in rich family in the village of Poongodi. Her parents Sundaram and Sampoornam were loving. She has two younger siblings, Dharani and Anjali. Sundharam arranges marriage for Sathya with Karthik, a businessman. Unfortunately, Karthik and Sathya's wedding is halted. Due to this, Sundharam dies of a heart attack. After her father's death, Sathya and her family moved to her uncle Devaraj's house in Chennai. There, Sathya and her family suffer much because of Devaraj's greedy wife Saroja. Saroja starts to take revenge on Sathya's family as Sundaram had rejected her son, Suresh's, marriage proposal with Sathya. Saroja determines to chase Sathya and her family from her house.

Then there is Jaihind Vilas family where Chidambaram is head of the family and proud fan of Mahatma. Chidambaram and his wife, Janaki, have four children. The elder Kumar is married to Gayathri, and they have a daughter Monisha. The second son Raju is lazy and sleeps at home all day. He has a wife Thilaga, who stays with her mother. They have their only daughter, and the youngest, Ragini, who goes to college. Their third son, Prakash, is short-tempered. Prakash's attempts to pass exams and get a government job are spoiled by Gayathri. Gayathri rules the family. The family is forced to do all the work for her except Prakash. Gayathri wants to take the Jai Hind Vilas property all for herself. Prakash is aware of this and obstructs her attempts to get the property.

Gayathri, works as a GM in star hotel where Sathya joins to work to support her family.

Devaraj and Sampoornam want Sathya and Suresh to get married, but Saroja disapproves of it and arranges a marriage alliance with another girl. Meanwhile, Sathya gets introduced to Prakash's parents and Prakash himself. Her meeting with Prakash and subsequent sessions does not go well. Nevertheless, they become good friends, after Sathya saves Prakash even though he wanted to abuse her. Prakash protects Sathya's sister Dharani from some youths with evil intentions. This leads to him to fall for her innocence, and he decides to marry her. Dharani, who is in love with her cousin Suresh, does not like it. In the meantime, Prakash arranges house for Sathya's family after Saroja chases them out. Sathya meets Karthik and works at his office. Karthik's mother, Annapoorani realises her mistake for stopping Sathya's marriage to her son and decides to get Sathya married to Karthik, as Karthik still loves her.

On the wedding day of Prakash and Dharani, Gayathri provokes Dharani to elope with Suresh. When she does, Gayathri humiliates Prakash by saying that not even a single girl wants to marry him. Prakash gets angry and forces Sathya to marry him, to win over Gayathri. Sathya accepts as Sampoornam begs her. Thus, Sathya accepts what her mother Sampoornam says and marries Prakash. However, Prakash is happy to think that he has defeated his sister-in-law Gayathri in the challenge. Later, Prakash takes his wife Sathya with him to his house Jai Hind Vilas. At the temple, Suresh marries Dharani and brings her to Devaraj's home but Saroja chases them out.

Sathya, Sampoornam and Anjali disown Dharani. Devaraj accepts Suresh and Dharani. Saroja wants to separate Dharani from her son but Dharani outwits her. A further argument between Prakash and Suresh leads to a rocky relationship between the two families. Meanwhile, Sathya and Prakash understand and fall in love with each other. Prakash gets into a quarrel with Sathya's mother and prevents her from meeting her mother. Unable to go against Prakash, Sathya agrees. Sathya gets pregnant, and meanwhile, Saroja plans to separate Dharani from Suresh. She puts poison in her own drink and accuses Dharani of mixing it. Suresh chases Dharani from their house and she attempts suicide.

A lady saves Tharani from killing herself. But, she is revealed to be an evil woman who plans to sell Dharani. Prakash saves Dharani from the lady. Dharani does not understand them and stays adamant with them. Due to several things, Sathya has a miscarriage, and hides it from Prakash. No one knows the truth apart from Sathya's mother, sister and Prakash's sister-in-law, Thilaga. When Sampoornam accidentally blurts out the truth, Prakash is infuriated and chases Sathya out. He refuses to talk to her. When finally, after accepting fate, he changes his mind and goes to propose to her, but he is stabbed by some goons who messed with Sathya and Prakash in the past but survived. Sathya and Prakash start to care more for each other. Meanwhile, Suresh still suspects Dharani for poisoning his mother. Later, when the truth comes out, Devaraj and Suresh disown Saroja and chase her from their house. Suresh later accepts Dharani and her innocence.

Prakash and Sathya join the government and become officers besides the troubles given by Gayathri. Later, Prakash shows the true colors of Gayathri in front of Jai Hind Vilas family and then, Kumar beats and expels her from Jaihind Vilas. Now, Gayathri joins her hands with Nambi, a businessman who loves Gayathri. Gayathri again troubles Prakash and Jaihind Vilas with help of Nambi but Prakash and Sathya stand against her and manage her evil plans to save his property from her. Kumar then marries Akila, a widow, and has a son, while Gayathri creates many obstacles in their life but Prakash protects the family. Sathya becomes pregnant again. Gayathri was losing everything and was defeated by Prakash. Further, frustrated Gayathri kidnapped Nambi. Then, Sathya was arrested during pregnancy. Later, Prakash found all of Gayathri's evil acts and saved Nambi from her and had Sathya released, but Gayatri shot Nambi from a distance and escaped.

During the mean time, Gayathri is abscond and an IPS officer Mantra(look alike of Gayathri) is appointed to find Gayathri. Gayathri killed Mantra and went to her place to disguise as Mantra. Sathya and Prakash found Mantra is killed and applied the case in court. Court appoints a new officer ACP Samuel Raja to find the truth behind Mantra and Gayathri. After a few struggles, Gayathri is arrested, but escapes from police with a pistol and shoots Akila in front of Kumar and Prakash and kidnaps Moni. The next day she had kidnapped Maha and decides to kill her to win Prakash. Prakash and Sathya search for the two kids along with the ACP Samuel Raja. First they rescued Moni but While rescuing Maha, Prakash shoots Gayathri as a self-defense and sentenced to prison for six years. After that, Prakash and Sathya lived happily with their children in the Jaihind Vilas.

Cast

Main
Krishna as "Prakash" Chidambaram, Sathyapriya's husband, Kumar, Raju and Ragini's brother, Gayathri's brother-in-law(44-1466)
Vani Bhojan as Sathyapriya "Sathya" Prakash, Prakash's wife,  Sundaram and Sampoornam's daughter, Dhaarani and Anjali's sister(01-1466)
 Rekha Krishnappa as in a dual roles
 Gayathri "Anniyar", Kumar's ex-wife, Prakash's ex-sister-in-law, shot by Prakash, killed by Kumar(42-1466), Manthra Devi IPS, Gayatri's look alike, killed by Gayathri(1267-1417)

Recurring
 Prakash Rajan as Kumar Chidambaram, Prakash's eldest brother(42-1466)
 Arvind Khathare as Raju Chidambaram, Prakash's second eldest brother(42-1466)
 Anitha Venkat replacement Sindhu Shyam  as Thilagavathy Raju, Prakash's second sister-in-law(56-1466)
 SVS Kumar as "Chidambaram", Prakash's father, a Gandhian(42-1466)
 Vennira Aadai Nirmala as "Janaki" Chidambaram, Prakash's mother(42-1466)
 Ganesh as "Moorthy", husband of Gayatri's sister(42-1466)
 Suhasini as Vinodhini Moorthy, Gayatri's sister, who commits suicide.(42-1429)
 Suchitra as Akila Kumar, Kumar's second wife and Prakash's second sister-in-law, who was killed by Gayathri(931-1435)
 R. Radha as Sathyakala, Moorthy's second wife(01-40, 1074–1466)
 Rajalakshmi Chandu replacement Surekha as Sampoornam Sundaram, Sathya, Dhaarani and Anjali's mother.(01-1466)
 Auditor Sridhar as Devaraj, Saroja's husband, Suresh and Sujatha's father, Sampoornam's brother, Dharani's father-in-law. Sathyapriya's uncle.(01-1466)
 Sabitha Anand as Saroja, Devaraj's wife, Suresh and Sujatha's mother, Dharani's mother-in-law, Sathyapriya's aunt(01-1335)
 Siddharth Venkatesh as "Suresh" Devaraj, Dharani's husband, Sathyapriya's cousin(41-1325)
 Shabnam as Dharani, Suresh's wife. Sathyapriya's first younger sister(01-1325)
 Udumalai Ravi as Ekambaram, Prakash's friend
 Ashok Kumar as Ashok, Prakash's friend
 Manush as Arivudai Nambi, killed by Gayatri(700-1086)
 Subramanian Gopalakrishnan replacement Yesakkiappan as Karthikeyan "Karthik" Annapoorani, Sathya's ex-fiancé, Sujatha's husband.(02-1333)
 Sunitha (2013-2015) replacement Sonia (2015-2016) replacement Sunitha (2016-2018) as Sujatha, Devaraj and Saroja's daughter. Karthik's wife and Sathyapriya's cousin.(41-1466)
 Usha Sai as Anjali Gunasekaran, Sathya and Dharani's younger sister.(01-1466)
 Suresh Joshua as Gunasekaran Dharmalingam, Anjali's husband.
 Revathee Shankar as Usha Rani Shankar(380-1466)
 Sivalingam Babu as Shankar
 VJ Sam replacement Raghul as Vasanthakumar "Vasanth" Shankar(379-1466)
 Nisha Krishnan replacement Vanitha Hariharan as Ragini Vasanth, Prakash's younger sister.(43-1466)
 Sreeja as Monisha Kumar, Kumar and Gayathri's daughter.(43-1466)
 Sanjana Sree as Mahalakshmi Prakash, Prakash and Sathya's daughter.(1282-1466)
 Krithika as Mahalakshmi Raju, Raju and Thilagavathi's daughter(478-1466)
 Sribala as "Ravi" (Akhila's brother-in-law)(931-1466)
 Meesai Rajendran as Dharmalingam "Lingam"(1123-1465)
 Ravi as "Ganesh", Saroja's tenant and sidekick, Moorthy's best friend.(41-1325)
 Gracey as Vijaya Ganesh, Saroja's tenant and sidekick(41-1324)
 Anbalaya Prabhakaran as Sundaramoorthy "Sundaram", Sampoornam's late husband, Sathya, Dharani and Anjali's father.(01-40)
 Raju Sathish as Sathish, Prakash's friend
 Saravanan as Saravanan, Prakash's friend
 Sai Vairam as Senthil, Prakash's friend
 Karthick Chandra as Assistant Commissioner of ACP Samuel Raja 
 Anuradha  as Annapoorani, Karthik's mother, Sujatha's mother-in-law.(02-1466)
 Aravish as Sathishkumar "Sathish" Prabhakaran(707-927)
 Nivisha as Sangeetha Sathish Prabhakaran, Moorthy's niece(650-927)
 Sekar Muthu Raja as Aravindkrishnan "Aravind", Minister Nallathambi's relative(853-921)
 Sasikala Shree as Vasanthi
 Ameya Nair as Anamika, Prakash's ex-girlfriend, who was killed in a bomb blast(1293-1364)
 Balaji as Amar, IPS Mantra Gayatri Devi 's husband
 Mercy as Malarvizhi Venkatesh, Nambi's sister
 Bhavani  as Sathyakala's mother
 Durai Mani as Velliangiri, Sathyakala's ex-husband, who is killed by Gayathri
 Deepa as Mangama, a supporter of Gayathri in the climax(1450-1464)

Original soundtrack

Title song
The title song was written by lyricist Yugabharathi, composed by music director Kiran. It was sung by Naresh Iyer.

Soundtrack

Production
The series was directed S. Kumaran and was produced by Vikatan Televistas Pvt Ltd, along with the production crew of 2001–2016.

Awards and nominations

Adaptations

Reception
In the first eight weeks of 2017, the series was the highest-rated primetime Tamil television series. In weeks 42 and 43 of 2017, it was at second position.

See also
 List of TV shows aired on Sun TV (India)

References

External links

Sun TV original programming
Tamil-language television shows
Tamil-language romance television series
2010s Tamil-language television series
2013 Tamil-language television series debuts
2018 Tamil-language television series endings